The Othello Syndrome is an album by pianist Uri Caine featuring compositions based on excerpts from Giuseppe Verdi's opera Otello which was released on the Winter & Winter label in 2008.

Reception

In his review for Allmusic, Ken Dryden notes that "Opera fans without a sense of humor will scoff at this recording, but Caine shows a love of the music, even in his madcap charts". PopMatters correspondent Will Layman said "The Othello Syndrome, Caine's zany take on Verdi's 1887 opera, is Caine's most consistently focused classical project and, plainly, one of the very best". On the website All About Jazz, C. Michael Bailey wrote, "The Othello Syndrome is Uri Caine at his mad scientist best: conjuring music from a million different places and making it sound like it was with you at home all the time". JazzTimes reviewer, Perry Tannenbaum, observed "The Othello Syndrome is obviously a meticulously crafted piece. While its daring and eclecticism will no doubt spark lively controversy, its heart points up the beauty of Verdi's score".

Track listing
All compositions by Uri Caine after Giuseppe Verdi
 "Othello's Victory" – 3:39  
 "Fire Song" – 4:56  
 "Drinking Song" – 4:25  
 "Love Duet with Othello and Desdemona" – 8:28  
 "Introduction to Act II" – 2:49  
 "Jago's Credo" – 4:42  
 "She's the Only One I Love" – 6:02  
 "Jago's Web" – 3:55  
 "Desdemona's Lament" – 4:44  
 "Am I a Fool?" – 5:18  
 "The Lion of Venice" – 3:53  
 "Othello's Confession" – 3:25  
 "The Willow Song / Ave Maria" – 7:41  
 "Murder" – 4:17  
 "The Death of Othello" – 5:05

Personnel
Uri Caine – piano, keyboards
Ralph Alessi – trumpet
Achille Succi, Chris Speed – clarinet 
Joyce Hammann – violin
Nguyên Lê – guitar
Tim Lefebvre – bass, electric bass
John Hebert bass
Jim Black, Zach Danziger – drums
Bruno Fabrizio Sorba, Stefano Bassanese – electronics 
Bunny Sigler (tracks 1, 4, 7, 10 & 15), Dhafer Youssef (tracks 1 & 14), Josefine Lindstrand (tracks 4, 9 & 13) – vocals 
Julie Patton (tracks 4 & 14), Marco Paolini (tracks 6 & 8), Sadiq Bey (tracks 6, 12 & 14) – voice

References

Winter & Winter Records albums
Uri Caine albums
2008 albums
Works based on Othello